Thyresis is the debut studio album by Brazilian melodic death metal band Thyresis, released in 2011. It is a concept album portraying a collective of thoughts and ideas about the world and society. According to the band's bassist and singer, the name of the band and the album is also explained in the concept.

Concept
"The concept of the album revolves around an organization of ideas about the world based on our (and mostly mine) personal experiences. I wanted to take part of what I felt and lived, and expose it as a critique, but in a positive way, with the intention of overcoming hard times.
Not only that, we chose to write a conceptual album to sort of explain the meaning of the word Thyresis, resulting in a way of facing life based on the overcoming of barriers, and not only a shallow name with no meaning."
—Victor Hugo Targino

Track listing
I: Silence Feels No Hold
 "Silent Monologue" (instrumental) - 1:20
 "Journey" - 5:48

II: Once Silent Voices Of Mine
"Refugee" (instrumental) - 1:38
"Voices Of Me" - 3:44
"Dispersed" - 4:45

III: Silence Feeds No Hope
"Broken Home" (instrumental) - 1:19
"A Dead Resource" - 5:04
"Beyond Infinity" - 5:32
"The Ties Of Ignorance" - 4:23

IV: Thy Resistance
"Inside" (instrumental) - 1:10
"Strength Within" - 5:27
"Thyresis" (instrumental) - 6:07

V: Silence Fills No Hole
"Still Alive" - 6:38
"Risen" - 4:44
"Silent Scream" (instrumental) - 3:16

Notes
 Track 6 and track 12, "Broken Home" and "Thyresis", respectively, features a speech by American serial killer Charles Milles Manson.
 All lyrics and texts written by Victor Hugo Targino, except 4 and 9 written by Josué "Kain" de Queiróz.

Personnel
 Victor Hugo Targino - bass, lead vocals, guitars
 Danilo Rufino - guitars
 Eduardo Borsero - guitars
 Demetrius Pedrosa - drums
 Victor Hugo Targino - producer, mixing, engineering
 Marcelo Macedo - drums engineering
 Paulinho "Tazz" - drums engineering
 Arthur Ferraz  - vocal engineering
 Jens Bogren - Mastering
 Rafael F.S. - Artwork
 Rodolfo Salgueiro - Band photos

References

External links 
 Alquimia Rock Club: Interview with Victor Hugo Targino and Thyresis' debut album review

2011 debut albums
Thyresis albums